Omar Arnulfo Rosas Salomón (born August 6, 1993, in Culiacán, Sinaloa) is a Mexican professional footballer who plays as a forward for Club Deportivo FAS.

Rosas broke into the Tiburones Rojos de Veracruz first team in 2014, playing in Liga MX and Copa MX matches.

On 14 October 2020 he scored the first goal in Liga de Balompié Mexicano history, helping San José F.C. to a 1–0 victory over Morelos F.C. in the league's first-ever match.

He signed with Honduran club Real C.D. España in January 2021.

References

External links
 
 
 

Living people
1993 births
Mexican footballers
Association football forwards
Albinegros de Orizaba footballers
Atlético Morelia players
C.D. Veracruz footballers
Chapulineros de Oaxaca footballers
Santos de Soledad players
Atlético Estado de México players
Cruz Azul Hidalgo footballers
Real C.D. España players
Liga MX players
Liga Premier de México players
Tercera División de México players
Liga Nacional de Fútbol Profesional de Honduras players
Mexican expatriate footballers
Mexican expatriate sportspeople in Honduras
Expatriate footballers in Honduras
Footballers from Sinaloa
Sportspeople from Culiacán
Liga de Balompié Mexicano players